Tone Sekelius (born 16 July 1997) is a Swedish social media influencer and singer.

Career

Sekelius' song "Awakening" entered Sverigetopplistan, the official Swedish singles' chart, at place 89 in February 2017.
 
In a 2021 interview with Aftonbladet, Sekelius came out as transgender and revealed that she would change her name to Tone. Sekelius' first name had previously been Thomas.
 
Sekelius competed in Melodifestivalen 2022 with the song "My Way". She was the first openly transgender performer in the contest. She placed 5th in the final with 84 points.

In 2023, Sekelius was a guest celebrity judge in the episode "Marathon Talent Hunt" of the reality television series Drag Race Sverige broadcast on SVT1 and SVT Play. She competed in Melodifestivalen 2023 with the song "Rhythm of My Show", which went on to place 12th (last) in the final with 20 points.

Discography

Singles

References

External links 
 

 

 

 

 

 

 

 

 

1997 births
Living people
People from Växjö
Transgender singers
Swedish LGBT singers
Melodifestivalen contestants of 2023
Melodifestivalen contestants of 2022